Chazeuil is the name of the following communes in France:

 Chazeuil, Côte-d'Or, in the Côte-d'Or department
 Chazeuil, Nièvre, in the Nièvre department